The second Kalvītis cabinet was the government of Latvia from 7 November 2006 to 20 December 2007.  It was the second government to be led by Aigars Kalvītis, who had previously been Prime Minister since 2004.  It took office on 7 November 2006, after the October 2006 election, succeeding the first Kalvītis cabinet, which had lasted from 2004 to 2006.  It was replaced by the second Godmanis cabinet on 20 December 2007, after the resignation of Kalvītis.

Government of Latvia
2006 establishments in Latvia
2007 disestablishments in Latvia
Cabinets established in 2006
Cabinets disestablished in 2007